This list of tallest buildings in Tennessee ranks skyscrapers in the U.S. state of Tennessee by height. Since 1970, all five tallest buildings statewide have been in Nashville. Currently nine out of the ten tallest buildings are in Nashville. The tallest by height is the AT&T Building, but the tallest by roof height is 4 Seasons Hotel and Residencies.

Tallest buildings

This list ranks Tennessee skyscrapers that stand at least 300 feet tall, based on standard height measurement. This includes spires and architectural details but does not include antenna masts or other objects not part of the original plans. Existing structures are included for ranking purposes based on present height.

Tallest under construction 
Buildings approved that are currently under construction, in site prep, or demolition phase. Buildings listed are planned to rise above .

Tallest pending construction 
These buildings have either been issued permits and approved that stand 280 feet (85 m) using standard measurement.

See also
List of tallest buildings in Nashville
List of tallest buildings in Knoxville
List of tallest buildings in Memphis

References

Tennessee
Tallest